Laurence Michael Comber (17 April 1903 – 9 January 1975) was an Australian rules footballer who played with Melbourne in the Victorian Football League (VFL).

After three games with Port Melbourne in 1927, Comber made his solitary senior VFL appearance for Melbourne in the final game of the 1929 season. He played in Melbourne's seconds premiership team two years later.

Notes

External links 

1903 births
Australian rules footballers from Victoria (Australia)
Port Melbourne Football Club players
Melbourne Football Club players
1975 deaths